The Mike's Place suicide bombing was a Palestinian suicide attack, perpetrated by Hamas and Al Aqsa Martyrs Brigades affiliated British Muslims, at Mike's Place, a bar in Tel Aviv, Israel, on April 30, 2003, killing three civilians and wounding 50.

First attack

Preparations for the attack 
The two assailants entered Israel from Jordan, via the Allenby Bridge.

They reached the scene of the attack from a nearby hotel where they had rented a room. Investigators who later searched their room discovered an elastic belt, explosives and a map of downtown Tel Aviv, on which several crowded venues, including Mike's Place, were clearly marked.

The attack
At 12:45 am on April 30, 2003, the suicide bomber approached Mike's Place and blew himself up at the entrance. The force of the blast killed three people and injured over 50. One of the wounded was security guard Avi Tabib, who managed to block the suicide bomber, preventing him from entering the bar and causing further fatalities.

Perpetrators 
After the attack, the Palestinian terrorist groups Hamas and Al Aqsa Martyrs Brigades claimed joint responsibility for the attack. In addition, Hamas spokesman identified the perpetrators as British Muslims Asif Muhammad Hanif, 22, from London and Omar Khan Sharif, 27, from Derby.

Failed second bombing 

Immediately after the first attack the other suicide bomber, who was carrying a concealed explosive belt, was supposed to carry out another attack but his explosive device failed to detonate. This second suicide bomber, who may have been injured at that point from the explosion, threw away his explosive belt and fled the scene. He reached the David Intercontinental Hotel in the Menashiya residential neighborhood of Jaffa and struggled with the security guard at the entrance trying to steal his ID, but he did not manage to do so. An examination of the unexploded bomb discarded by Omar Khan Sharif showed that it had been hidden in a book and contained standard explosives.

The body of the second suicide bomber was washed ashore on the Tel Aviv beachfront on May 12 and was eventually identified on May 19, 2003. Forensic experts said he had drowned.

Subsequent related events 
Despite the events of that day, the bar reopened on Yom Haatzmaut, Israeli Independence Day.

ISM visit controversy
On April 25, five days before the attack, Hanif and Sharif had visited International Solidarity Movement (ISM) office, and after chatting for 15 minutes with an ISM volunteer, the men joined a group of 20 people to lay flowers at the site of Rachel Corrie's death for 10 minutes.

ISM said activists Hanif and Sharif appeared to be "typical Brits." An ISM volunteer reported that the bombers had been among a group of 'alternative tourists' who were offered tea when they paid an unscheduled visit to an ISM office on the way to a memorial for Rachel Corrie.

Cultural references
A documentary called Blues by the Beach, about the Tel Aviv Mike's Place, the suicide attack at the bar, and the people affected by it, was directed by American-Israeli filmmaker Joshua Faudem and produced by Jack Baxter, who was seriously injured while making the film.

The Jerusalem branch appears in the film The Holy Land, about a wayward Yeshiva student. The director, Eitan Gorlin, worked as one of the bar's first bartenders in 1994.

The attack is mentioned in the TV series The Blacklist by the main character Raymond Reddington, as he describes the aftermath created by the explosion.

References

External links 
 Suicide bomber kills 3 in Tel Aviv - published on CNN on April 30, 2003
 Suicide bomber strikes Tel Aviv - published on BBC News on April 30, 2003
 Tel Aviv bombers 'were British' - published on The Guardian on April 30, 2003
 Tel Aviv Suicide Bombers Were Brits - published on Sky News on April 30, 2003
 Suicide Bomber Hits Tel Aviv Nightclub - published on the Milwaukee Journal Sentinel on April 30, 2003
 Mike's Place web site
 Blues by the Beach
 Details of April 30- 2003 Tel Aviv suicide bombing - published at the Israeli Ministry of Foreign Affairs

2003 in international relations
2000s crimes in Tel Aviv
2003 murders in Israel
April 2003 crimes
April 2003 events in Asia
Attacks on bars
Attacks on buildings and structures in 2003
Attacks on buildings and structures in Tel Aviv
Building bombings in Israel
Hamas suicide bombings
Islamic terrorist incidents in 2003
Murder in Tel Aviv
Suicide bombings in 2003
Terrorist incidents in Israel in 2003
Terrorist incidents in Tel Aviv
Islamic terrorism in Israel